Anacapa Island Lighthouse is a lighthouse in California, United States, on the entrance to Santa Barbara Channel, California. Constructed in 1912, it was the last major light station built on the west coast. Anacapa and several other islands were collectively designated as Channel Islands National Monument in 1938, though the Coast Guard retained responsibility for the Anacapa lighthouse. Now fully automated and unmanned, the light house still operates, but the National Park Service (NPS) is responsible for Channel Islands National Park.

Anacapa Island is noted now for an environmental restoration program devised by the NPS to exterminate the large population of non-native rats which infested the island and was making significant inroads on native species. The program, which began in 2003, selectively killed off the invaders with few adverse effects on the non-targeted native wildlife species. By 2014, after careful examination of the island, NPS could declare it rat-free.

History
Positioned at the eastern entrance to the Santa Barbara Channel, Anacapa was a natural choice for a lighthouse. The Lighthouse Board decided to place a light on the island, but to limit the expense of building an offshore beacon, an unmanned acetylene lens lantern on a tower was erected in 1912. In 1932, the current permanent light station was built on the island, and was the last major light station to be built on the west coast. The  tower and fog signal were built on the highest point of the island. In 1938, under the direction of Franklin D. Roosevelt, Santa Barbara and Anacapa Islands became Channel Islands National Monument. The United States Coast Guard automated the station in 1966. The lighthouse is still an active aid to navigation.

Historical Information from Coast Guard web site:

Current usage 
The buildings other than the lighthouse are now being utilized by the National Park Service.

Geography 
Anacapa is the smallest and the nearest of the Channel Islands to the mainland. It lies southwest of the city of Ventura.

Image gallery

See also

 List of lighthouses in the United States
National Register of Historic Places listings in Ventura County, California

References

External links

Lighthouses on the National Register of Historic Places in California
Buildings and structures in the Channel Islands of California
Transportation buildings and structures in Ventura County, California
National Register of Historic Places in Ventura County, California
National Register of Historic Places in Channel Islands National Park
Lighthouses completed in 1912
Lighthouses completed in 1932
1912 establishments in California
Historic districts on the National Register of Historic Places in California